The 1945 Tulane Green Wave football team represented Tulane University as a member of the Southeastern Conference (SEC) during the 1945 college football season. Led by Claude Simons Jr. in his fourth and final year as head coach, the Green Wave played their home games at Tulane Stadium in New Orleans. Tulane finished the season with an overall record of 2–6–1 and a mark of 1–3–1 in conference play, tying for tenth place in the SEC.

Schedule

References

Tulane
Tulane Green Wave football seasons
Tulane Green Wave football